The Nutty Professor franchise consists of American science fiction-slapstick comedies, including three theatrical films, one straight-to-home video release, a musical stage play, and a theatrical reboot in development. Based on an original story by Jerry Lewis, inspired loosely by Strange Case of Dr. Jekyll and Mr. Hyde (1886) by Robert Louis Stevenson. 

The plot of each installment centers around individuals with genius-level Intelligence, yet awkward and nerdy social skills. Upon meeting beautiful women, they develop potions that transform them into attractive, confident, sofisticated, albeit villainous alternate personalities who attempt to take over their original counterparts. The series explores the concept of self worth.

The original film was a success both critically and financially, and has earned the status of being regarded as a comedy classic. It was ranked #99 by the American Film Institute on its 100 Years...100 Laughs list. A direct-sequel was eventually released in 2008, albeit an animated straight-to-home video release. Lewis reprised his role, though the movie centered around his grandson instead. The film gain little-to-no significant media attention with Common Sense Media providing a 2 out of 5 star rating, and its consensus recommending the original instead. Lewis continued involvement with the franchise as executive producer and the remake film and its sequel, then later served as director of a musical stage production in 2012.

The remake starring Eddie Murphy and released in 1996, was a smash-hit at the box office and attained overall favorable reviews from critics. A sequel was released in 2000 to mixed critical reception. Though it fared well financially, it was far from the success of its predecessor.

A reboot is in development, from Project X Entertainment.

Film

The Nutty Professor (1963)

Professor Julius Kelp is a brilliant science teacher, at a university. However, he has a problem with attracting women due to his clumsy, awkward, inarticulate nature. Women deem him as unattractive. Kelp becomes obsessed with impressing a beautiful student named Stella. With his background in chemistry, Kelp decides to develop a potion that will change him into a different person. His new suave alter ego named Buddy Love, is challenged with winning Stella's affections before his short-supply of potion is depleted.

Film historians regard The Nutty Professor as the most memorable film of Lewis’ long career. In 2004, the film was selected for preservation in the National Film Registry by the Library of Congress for being "culturally, historically or aesthetically significant."

The Nutty Professor (1996)

Brilliant and obese scientist Sherman Klump invents a miraculous weight-loss solution. After a date with chemistry student Carla Purty goes badly, a depressed Klump tries the solution on himself. Upon taking the potion, Klump instantly loses 250 pounds. The side effects, besides becoming physically fit include a second personality who calls himself Buddy Love and is obnoxiously self-assertive, conceited alternate personality. Buddy proves to be more popular than Sherman, but his arrogance and bad behavior quickly spiral out of control. During these series of events, Klump must decide whether he enjoys popularity, or values self-respect.

Nutty Professor II: The Klumps (2000)

After choosing to love himself, over his popular and assertive alternate personality, Professor Sherman Klump has found love in a beautiful and kind woman named Denise. In preparations for their wedding, his undesired alter-ego named Buddy Love begins taking over. Though Klump has ceased taking his self-improving potion, Love continues to present himself and is determined to stay. After a number of appearances, Klump extracts his alternate personality's genes and decides rid the world of his pesky partner, at the risk of his own psychological decline. A laboratory incident including the accidental combination of the genes with dog hair, result in Buddy Love taking on his own existence outside of Klump's body. Unaware of the Love's new existence, the engaged couple begin to perfect a new rejuvenation formula and their fortune seems assured, until Love appears and steals it. Professor Klump's cognitive abilities continue to decline. In a final effort to defeat Buddy Love, the Professor develops a new and more potent formula that will degenerate the villain back to his state of genetic material. Using Love's canine DNA against him, he defeats him with the use of a tennis ball covered in the new potion. As Klump slips away, Denise helps him drink the genetic matter, restoring his genius intellect and resetting everything back to normal. The pair continue to prepare for their wedding, and are married.

The Nutty Professor (2008)

Also known as The Nutty Professor: Facing The Fear, it is an animated legacy-sequel to the original film, it follows the workings of Julius Kelp's grandson.

Harold Kelp is an aspiring inventor, who struggles to perfect his experiments. Intimidated by his grandfather's legacy, Harold has dreams of his failure taking the form of a giant monster. After coming into conflict with a group of angry individuals involved in one of his demonstrations, Harold decides to attend a science academy run by his grandfather, Professor Julius Kelp. Upon arriving at the school, Harold meets a beautiful woman named Polly McGreggor, with whom he becomes infatuated. Determined to win her affection, Harold finds and takes his grandfather's secret potion. The elixir unleashes Harold's confident, self-loving alternate personality that calls himself Jack. Though initially popular with the fellow students, Jack's outrageous behavior gets out of control and causes more mischief than Harold had anticipated. Due to Harold's continued time evolving into Jack, his grades begin slipping. Learning of Harold's actions, Julius once again takes the potion to become Buddy Love. In his alternate form as Buddy Love, Julius teaches his grandson to appreciate who he is and to be comfortable in his own skin. Harold's anxieties are accidentally unleashed by one of Professor Kelp's inventions, as the visionary monster from his nightmares. Harold bravely faces his fears, and defeats the creature. In doing so, Harold says goodbye to Jack once and for all before sharing a kiss with Polly.

Reboot
In August 2020, it was announced that a reboot of The Nutty Professor franchise was in development. James Vanderbilt, William Sherak and Paul Neinstein serve as producers, while the search for additional talent is ongoing. The movie is under development from Project X Entertainment.

Main cast and characters
 A dark gray cell indicates the character did not appear in that film.
 A  indicates the actor or actress lent only their voice for their character.
 A  indicates an actor or actress portrayed a younger version of their character.

Additional crew and production details

Reception

Box office and financial performance

Notes

Critical and public response

Stage
A musical comedy adaptation ran on Broadway after a tryout production that opened at the Nashville Tennessee Performing Arts Center from July to August 2012. Lewis directed the musical, with choreography by Joann M. Hunter.  The musical has a book and lyrics written by Rupert Holmes and music composed by Marvin Hamlisch, with scenery by David Gallo and costumes by Ann Hould-Ward. Michael Andrew was cast in the lead role as Professor Julius Kelp. The plot closely follows the original film. The production received warm reviews for its choreography, songs, cast, set, and story.

Novelization
The accompanying novel written by the author of the musical's script, Rupert Holmes, received praise for its use of comedy as well as for the meaningful underlying message.

References 

American film series
The Nutty Professor
Film series introduced in 1963
Paramount Pictures franchises
Universal Pictures franchises